Thursday Till Sunday is a 2012 Chilean coming-of-age film directed by Dominga Sotomayor Castillo in her debut feature.

The film premiered at the 2012 International Film Festival Rotterdam. Later that year, it won the Grand Prix of the New Horizons Film Festival in Wrocław.

Plot
The film is set during a family trip to the north of Chile over a long weekend. As the journey becomes increasingly challenging, conflicts emerge between the couple, while Lucía (played by Santi Ahumada) and her brother remain unaware that this will be their father's farewell and potentially the final family trip.

Cast
 Francisco Pérez-Bannen
 Paola Giannini
 Santi Ahumada
 Emiliano Freifeld

References

External links

2012 films
Chilean drama films
Coming-of-age drama films
Chilean coming-of-age films